Chengxing Road is a metro station on Line 4 of the Hangzhou Metro in China. It is located in the Jianggan District of Hangzhou.

References

Railway stations in Zhejiang
Railway stations in China opened in 2015
Hangzhou Metro stations